South Apopka is a census-designated place and an unincorporated area in Orange County, Florida, United States. Per the 2020 census, the population was 6,803. It is part of the Orlando–Kissimmee Metropolitan Statistical Area.

Geography

Demographics

2020 census

Note: the US Census treats Hispanic/Latino as an ethnic category. This table excludes Latinos from the racial categories and assigns them to a separate category. Hispanics/Latinos can be of any race.

2000 Census
As of the census of 2000, there were 5,800 people, 1,763 households, and 1,338 families residing in the CDP.  The population density was 814.3/km (2,111.2/mi2).  There were 1,925 housing units at an average density of 270.3/km (700.7/mi2).  The racial makeup of the CDP was 26.81% White, 65.38% African American, 0.57% Native American, 0.07% Asian, 0.10% Pacific Islander, 5.50% from other races, and 1.57% from two or more races. Hispanic or Latino of any race were 12.76% of the population.

There were 1,763 households, out of which 36.1% had children under the age of 18 living with them, 37.4% were married couples living together, 31.5% had a female householder with no husband present, and 24.1% were non-families. 18.2% of all households were made up of individuals, and 6.1% had someone living alone who was 65 years of age or older.  The average household size was 3.28 and the average family size was 3.70.

In the CDP, the population was spread out, with 34.9% under the age of 18, 10.4% from 18 to 24, 26.8% from 25 to 44, 18.8% from 45 to 64, and 9.1% who were 65 years of age or older.  The median age was 29 years. For every 100 females, there were 92.6 males.  For every 100 females age 18 and over, there were 84.2 males.

The median income for a household in the CDP was $25,563, and the median income for a family was $29,750. Males had a median income of $21,757 versus $18,567 for females. The per capita income for the CDP was $10,864.  About 26.8% of families and 34.9% of the population were below the poverty line, including 49.3% of those under age 18 and 38.5% of those age 65 or over.

References

Website with inside information http://www.southapopka.net

Census-designated places in Orange County, Florida
Greater Orlando
Census-designated places in Florida